Sultan Rahi (June 24, 1938 – January 9, 1996) was a Pakistani actor, producer and screenwriter. 

He established himself as one of the leading and most successful actors of Pakistani and Punjabi cinema, and received a reputation as Pakistan's "Clint Eastwood". 

During a career spanning 40 years, he acted in some 703 Punjabi films and 100 Urdu films, winning around 160 awards.

Rahi earned two Nigar Awards for his work in Babul (1971) and Basheera (1972). 

In 1975 he portrayed the character of Maula Jatt in Wehshi Jatt, winning his third Nigar Award. He reprised the role in its sequel Maula Jatt. 

Some of his other films include Sher Khan, Chan Veryam, Kaley Chore, The Godfather, Sharif Badmash and Wehshi Gujjar. The following is a. Complete list of his films:

1950s

1960s

1970s

1980s

1990s

See also 
 List of Pakistani actors
 Lists of Pakistani films

References

External links 
 
Pakistani film-related lists
Pakistani filmographies
Sultan, Rahi